Melanaspis is a genus of true bugs belonging to the family Diaspididae.

The species of this genus are found in America and Southern Africa.

Species:
 Melanaspis araucariae Lepage, 1942
 Melanaspis glomerata (Green, 1903)

References

Diaspididae